Star Awards 2018 (also SA2018SG, Chinese: 红星大奖2018) is a television award ceremony which is held in Singapore. The Post Party and Ceremony Awards was broadcast live on 22 April 2018. A total of 15 awards were handed out during the ceremony, among which the Special Achievement Award, an award given out to a celebrity in recognition to meritorious contribution, returned after a 15-year absence, with the award last presented in 2003, in the place of All-Time Favourite Artiste, which was not presented this year, and the third ceremony overall, after 2007 and 2013.

The ceremony saw When Duty Calls winning the most awards (five), among which they were Best Theme Song, Best Director, Best Drama Serial, Best Actor and Best Supporting Actress; The Lead was the second-biggest winning drama serial, clinching the two other major categories plus Young Talent award, for a total of three. Seven other programs won at least one award during the ceremony.

Programme details

Star Awards 2018 - Creative Achievement Awards 红星大奖 专业奖项颁奖礼
On 5 April 2018, the Creative Achievement Awards was held to recognise the achievements of Mediacorp's creative staff in the past year. It was held in Level 9 of MediaCorp Campus; the guest-of-honour, Tham Loke Kheng, CEO of MediaCorp, gave out the Awards to the recipients.

Winners are listed first, highlighted in boldface.

Star Awards 2018 Awards Ceremony 红星大奖2018 颁奖典礼
The award ceremony was shown live on 22 April 2018.

Winners are listed first, highlighted in boldface.

Special Awards

The Special Achievement Award is an award presented annually at the Star Awards, a ceremony that was established since 1994. The Special Achievement Award returned after a 14 years hiatus, with the last award being 2003 where it was temporarily discontinued between 2004 and 2017 in place of the All-Time Favourite Artiste award.

Top 10 Most Popular Artistes
Every year, a poll of 1,000 people representing a wide demographic across Singapore's population, were conducted independently by an accredited market research company, will be used to shortlist the nominations for the Top 20 Male and Female artistes, where they faced the public vote.

This year, 50% of the final results will be derived from this pool of 1,000 people; while the other 50% will comprise telepoll and online voting as a measure of their fan support, to ensure that the representation of results for the Top 10 Most Popular Male and Female artistes were part of the continuous efforts by the Star Awards Committee.

The telepoll lines will be opened from 16 March 2018 and ends on 22 April 2018, 8:30pm.

Key

Post Show Party 庆功宴
The Post Show Party aired at 10.30pm, after the broadcast of News Tonight. During the Post Show, guests Joanna Dong and Nathan Hartono teased on an upcoming reality-competition that would promote local Chinese pop culture.

Summary of shows with multiple nominations and wins

Most Nominations
Programs that received multiple nominations are listed below, by number of nominations per work:

Most Wins
Programs that received multiple wins are listed below, by number of wins per work:

Presenters and Performers
The following individuals presented awards or performed musical numbers.

Presenters

Pornsak was absent on the ceremony; Lee Teng 李腾 represented Pornsak on his behalf.
Thomas Ong 王沺裁 was absent on the ceremony; Chen Liping 陈莉萍 represented Ong on her behalf.

Performers

Trivia

Changes to awards categories
The Best Newcomer returned for the first time after a two-year absence, with the last award presented in 2015.
This year marked the first show a web series (Dear DJ) had garnered nominations (for Best Newcomer and Best Theme Song).

Consecutive nominees and recipients
Chen Hanwei received his second Best Supporting Actor Award.
Rebecca Lim received her second Best Actress Award.
Quan Yi Fong won her fifth (and second consecutive) Best Programme Host Award.
Thomas Ong received Top 10 Most Popular Male Artistes award; Ong was absent during the ceremony while Chen Liping represented him on his behalf.
Belinda Lee and Pan Lingling received her fifth Top 10 Most Popular Female Artistes award since 2010 and 2000, respectively.
Kym Ng received her first acting award this year.
Guo Liang received his fifth Top 10 Most Popular Male Artistes award since 2010.
All the nominations for the Best Drama Serial were nominated for the first time, ending a five-year streak where at least one nomination received a repeat nomination since the 2012 ceremony.

Firsts in top 10
Jin Yinji and Sheila Sim both received their first Top 10 Most Popular Female Artistes award; for the former, Jin was nominated for eight consecutive years before finally winning her first award; Jin was also the oldest winner to win the award.

Absence of awards
This ceremony was the third ceremony since 2004 (after 2007 and 2013) to not present the All-time Favourite Artiste award. The award would return again in 2019 due to Kym Ng winning her tenth Top 10 award.
The Special Achievement Award took its place, having returned for the first time since 2003, after 15 years of absence.
Although the Channel 8 News & Current Affairs had at least ten news presenters by the end of 2018, the Best News Presenter and Best Current Affairs Presenter awards were neither presented for the fifth consecutive year.
For unknown reasons, the Rocket award, which is given to the most improved Mediacorp artiste, was also not presented for the second consecutive year.
The Best News Story, Best Current Affairs Story, and Best Variety Special were also not presented this year, all three of which were absent for the first time since 2000.
Consequently, the absence for Best Variety Special ended Star Awardss 10-year streak of their nomination for the category, with the last time happened being 2005.

Revisions of Eligibility Criteria
To recognise the contributions to local television more broadly, this year's awards will open up nominations to non-Mediacorp artistes. In response, the Star Awards Committee revised the criteria after considering the constructive feedback of industry watchers and audiences. Acting categories were mostly revised, as reflected below:
Artistes have to play as a lead role in a drama or host in a variety or info-ed program, or as a supporting role/assistant host in at least three eligible programmes or at least 30 episodes out of all eligible programmes, whichever applicable.
For the Evergreen Artiste Award (an award which recognises contributions by industry veterans), artistes were now evaluated based on the performances for the entire year to promote versatility. Previously, this award is evaluated on a single program only.

Star Awards 2019 nominations
The 2018 main ceremony won the Best Variety Producer award, but lost the Best Variety Special to the finals of SPOP Sing!, on the ceremony next year.

References

External links 

 Star Awards 2018 Toggle Information Page

Star Awards